Sheino is a rural locality (a selo) and the administrative center of Sheinskoye Rural Settlement, Korochansky District, Belgorod Oblast, Russia. The population was 750 as of 2010. There are 13 streets.

Geography 
Sheino is located 31 km southwest of Korocha (the district's administrative centre) by road. Ushakovo is the nearest rural locality.

References 

Rural localities in Korochansky District